Sorana Cîrstea and Marina Erakovic were the defending champions, but they chose not to participate this year.Iveta Benešová and Barbora Záhlavová-Strýcová won in the final 1-6, 6-0, [10-7] against Vladimíra Uhlířová and Renata Voráčová.

Seeds

  Anna-Lena Grönefeld /  Patty Schnyder (quarterfinals)
  Iveta Benešová /  Barbora Záhlavová-Strýcová (champions)
  Klaudia Jans /  Alicja Rosolska (quarterfinals)
  Andrea Hlaváčková /  Lucie Hradecká (first round)

Draw

Finals
{{16TeamBracket-Compact-Tennis3-Byes
| RD1=First round
| RD2=Quarterfinals
| RD3=Semifinals
| RD4=Finals
| RD1-seed01=1
| RD1-team01= A-L Grönefeld P Schnyder
| RD1-score01-1=6
| RD1-score01-2=6
| RD1-score01-3= 
| RD1-seed02= 
| RD1-team02= J Coin M-È Pelletier
| RD1-score02-1=1
| RD1-score02-2=1
| RD1-score02-3= 
| RD1-seed03= 
| RD1-team03= L Dekmeijere A Klepač
| RD1-score03-1=3
| RD1-score03-2=1
| RD1-score03-3= 
| RD1-seed04= 
| RD1-team04= V Uhlířová R Voráčová
| RD1-score04-1=6
| RD1-score04-2=6
| RD1-score04-3= 
| RD1-seed05=3
| RD1-team05= K Jans A Rosolska
| RD1-score05-1=7
| RD1-score05-2=62
| RD1-score05-3=[10]
| RD1-seed06= 
| RD1-team06= Y Fedak K Marosi
| RD1-score06-1=5
| RD1-score06-2=7
| RD1-score06-3=[4]
| RD1-seed07= 
| RD1-team07= M Shaughnessy K Srebotnik
| RD1-score07-1=6
| RD1-score07-2=6
| RD1-score07-3= 
| RD1-seed08= 
| RD1-team08= S Lefèvre A Védy
| RD1-score08-1=2
| RD1-score08-2=1
| RD1-score08-3= 
| RD1-seed09=ALT
| RD1-team09= T Bacsinszky P Hercog
| RD1-score09-1=3
| RD1-score09-2=4
| RD1-score09-3= 
| RD1-seed10= 
| RD1-team10=
| RD1-score10-1=6
| RD1-score10-2=6
| RD1-score10-3= 
| RD1-seed11= 
| RD1-team11= T Malek A Parra Santonja
| RD1-score11-1=3
| RD1-score11-2=6
| RD1-score11-3=[10]
| RD1-seed12=4
| RD1-team12= A Hlaváčková L Hradecká
| RD1-score12-1=6
| RD1-score12-2=3
| RD1-score12-3=[6]
| RD1-seed13= 
| RD1-team13= S Borwell R Kops-Jones
| RD1-score13-1=2
| RD1-score13-2=0
| RD1-score13-3= 
| RD1-seed14=WC
| RD1-team14= K Clijsters K Flipkens
| RD1-score14-1=6
| RD1-score14-2=6
| RD1-score14-3= 
| RD1-seed15= 
| RD1-team15= J Görges U Radwańska
| RD1-score15-1=7
| RD1-score15-2=3
| RD1-score15-3=[8]
| RD1-seed16=2
| RD1-team16=
| RD1-score16-1=6
| RD1-score16-2=6
| RD1-score16-3=[10]
| RD2-seed01=1
| RD2-team01= A-L Grönefeld P Schnyder
| RD2-score01-1=2
| RD2-score01-2=3
| RD2-score01-3= 
| RD2-seed02= 
| RD2-team02= V Uhlířová R Voráčová
| RD2-score02-1=6
| RD2-score02-2=6
| RD2-score02-3= 
| RD2-seed03=3
| RD2-team03= K Jans A Rosolska
| RD2-score03-1=3
| RD2-score03-2=3
| RD2-score03-3= 
| RD2-seed04= 
| RD2-team04= M Shaughnessy K Srebotnik 
| RD2-score04-1=6
| RD2-score04-2=6
| RD2-score04-3= 
| RD2-seed05= 
| RD2-team05=

External links
 Main Draw

BGL Luxembourg Open
Luxembourg Open
2009 in Luxembourgian tennis